Mount Gould is a peak on the Continental Divide in Glacier National Park, Montana, United States. It is the highest point of the Garden Wall, a distinctive ridge of the Lewis Range. It is most notable for its huge, steep east face, which drops  in only one-half mile (0.8 km). This face provides a backdrop to Grinnell Lake, and is often photographed.

Mount Gould was named in 1887 by George Bird Grinnell for his hunting companion, George H. Gould, and the name was officially adopted in 1929 by the United States Board on Geographic Names.

The first recorded ascent of Mount Gould was in 1920, by Frank B. Wynn, Harry R. Horn, Henry H. Goddard, and party. They used the West Face route, which is the easiest and most commonly used route today. It starts from the Highline Trail, which skirts the west side of the peak, and involves some rock scrambling but no technical climbing.

Climbing the sheer East Face of Mount Gould is theoretically possible; however the brittle, loose nature of the rock in Glacier National Park makes the ascent highly technical, unpleasant, and dangerous.

Climate

Based on the Köppen climate classification, Mount Gould is located in an alpine subarctic climate zone characterized by long, usually very cold winters, and short, cool to mild summers. Temperatures can drop below −10 °F with wind chill factors below −30 °F.

Geology

Like the mountains in Glacier National Park, Mount Gould is composed of sedimentary rock laid down during the Precambrian to Jurassic periods. The bulk of the peak is composed of limestone of the Siyeh Formation, and the conspicuous dark band on the east face is a diorite sill.

See also
 List of mountains and mountain ranges of Glacier National Park (U.S.)

Notes

Sources
 J. Gordon Edwards and Josephine Gould, A Climber's Guide to Glacier National Park, Falcon Press, 1991. .

External links

 Weather forecast: Mount Gould

Mountains of Glacier County, Montana
Mountains of Flathead County, Montana
Mountains of Glacier National Park (U.S.)
Lewis Range
Mountains of Montana